, known for both her full name or by her stage name Tomomi, is a Japanese musician, singer and songwriter. She serves as the bassist and a vocalist (in their earlier years she used to share lead vocals with Haruna) of the Japanese rock band Scandal. She co-wrote most of their songs throughout the band's career.

Early life 
Ogawa was born in Hyōgo Prefecture and was enrolled at a talent school in Osaka named Caless Prior to her career as a musician, she appeared along with her future bandmate Mami Sasazaki and singer Yuya Matsushita in a TV commercial.

Career 
On March 11, 2014, Oricon and Fuji TV announced that Tomomi Ogawa will be the new bassist of the Domoto Brothers Band, the house band that plays for the Sunday night TV musical variety show . The variety show is hosted by Koichi Domoto and Tsuyoshi Domoto. Her first TV appearance with the band was on April 6, 2014.

References

External links

  
 

1990 births
Living people
Musicians from Hyōgo Prefecture
Women bass guitarists
Japanese rock bass guitarists
Japanese women rock singers
Japanese hard rock musicians
Sony Music Entertainment Japan artists
Scandal (Japanese band) members
21st-century Japanese singers
21st-century Japanese women singers
21st-century bass guitarists